Jeff Sperbeck is an NFL certified contract advisor who has represented over 100 NFL football players throughout his nearly 30-year career as a football agent. After serving as the Director of Octagon's football division from 2001–09, he left and created The Novo Agency, in 2010.

Early years
In 1988, Sperbeck began working for Pro Asset Management, where he started a career in the sports marketing and management field.

In 1989, Sperbeck moved to San Francisco and created his own sports marketing and events company.

In 1991, Sperbeck partnered with Hall of Fame San Francisco 49ers Ronnie Lott and 49ers running back Roger Craig to form CLS Sports, Inc. Jeff Sperbeck then became the manager for all of John Elway and Ronnie Lott's marketing and business activities.

Sullivan & Sperbeck
In 1994, Sperbeck partnered with Mike Sullivan to form Sullivan & Sperbeck in Northern California. When Sullivan & Sperbeck combined their skills, they had over 30 years in NFL player management and marketing. Their agency's roster included over two dozen NFL players, coaches, and retired legends; including Trent Dilfer, Damon Huard, Johnnie Morton, Eric Turner, William Floyd, Joey Porter, John Elway, Jim Plunkett, Ronnie Lott, Mike Bellotti, and Sonny Lubick.

Octagon Football
In 2001, global sports marketing company Octagon Football acquired Sullivan & Sperbeck. Octagon created its football division around Sullivan & Sperbeck's existing infrastructure in Northern California. Jeff Sperbeck served as the Director of Octagon football. He, alongside Mike Sullivan, lead the growth of the division to over 80 active NFL players.

The Novo Agency
Sperbeck left Octagon in late 2009 and started The Novo Agency. Currently, The Novo Agency's roster includes Hall of Famers; John Elway, Ronnie Lott, Jim Plunkett, ACTIVE PLAYERS; Danny Shelton, Brandin Cooks, Billy Winn, Kenny Bell, Thomas Sperbeck, John Boyett, COACHES - Chris Strausser (Indianapolis Colts), Frank Pollack (Cincinnati Bengals), Greg Knapp (New York Jets), Joe Lombardi (Los Angeles Chargers)as well as retired players Joey Porter, Clark Haggans, Dennis Dixon, Ed Tu'amu, Chris Fuamatu Ma'afala, Christian & Fenuki Tupou, Daryn Colledge, Ramses Barden, Joel Dreessen, LaMichael  James, and Mike Brisiel.

Rep1 Football
The Novo Agency merged with Rep1 Sports in 2018 and Sperbeck continues to represent current coaches, retired players, and select active players.

7Cellars Wine & Spirits
In 2015, alongside his long time client and friend John Elway, Sperbeck founded 7Cellars. The company produces premium and ultra premium wines from the Central Coast of California as well as the Napa Valley under the respective names; The Farm Collection and Elway's Reserve.

References

American sports agents
Living people
Place of birth missing (living people)
Year of birth missing (living people)